Gillams may refer to:

 Angus Gillams (born 1995), English squash player
 Gillams, Newfoundland and Labrador, Canada
 Gillam's bell or Gillham's bell, scientific name Darwinia oxylepis, plant in the myrtle family Myrtaceae

See also
 Gillam (disambiguation)